OVGuide was a website aggregator which allowed users to find online video content. The company was acquired by FOTV Media Networks Inc. for over $10M in 2016. -OVGuide is no longer available-

Included sites
Sites are submitted by users and selected based on editorial review. Once a site is approved for inclusion, it is categorized according to its niche content. Editors do not review specific video titles, but look at the overall quality of a site, such as checking for enough unique video content, potential spyware, excessive ads, or other factors which would make a video site unacceptable for inclusion.

Special events
OVGuide participated as one of the exclusive live streamers of Leeza Gibbons' 'A Night to Make a Difference' at Mr. Chow, an Oscar dinner and charity celebration, which took place on Sunday, February 22, 2009. The event marked the first time an Academy Awards Oscar Party was streamed online to a live worldwide audience.

Acquisitions 
In 2010 OVGuide acquired IBeatYou. IBeatYou.com is an online multimedia competition site where users challenge each other in hundreds of categories using videos, photos and text responses. Winning entries are selected by public votes. It ran primarily as a separate business venture with some integration into OVGuide. The developers at IBeatYou played key roles in redesigning an improved version of OVGuide that was released at the end of 2010. Other projects developed by the IBeatYou team include Picbeat - a photo sharing site, and Juicybooth.com, which allows users to interactively spoof pictures. The total deal was worth $2.975M, with $1.487M in earnout. IBeatYou was later acquired from OVGuide by Photobucket in an all-stock transaction.

Live Matrix was acquired by OVGuide in early 2012. They are a guide to live and upcoming scheduled events on the Web. It was seen as a strategic business move to expand OVGuide into becoming a live event guide too. As part of the deal, Sanjay Reddy, who was the CEO/co-founder of Live Matrix, replaced Peter Lee as OVGuide's new CEO. Reddy was the SVP, Business Development & Strategic Planning, at Gemstar-TV Guide International and has an extensive background in the online multimedia space. It was an all-stock deal.

See also
 Eguiders
 YouTube
 Tubefilter

References

External links 
 Official website

Video hosting